"Sabrosito" is the fourth episode of the third season of the AMC television series Better Call Saul, the spinoff series of Breaking Bad. The episode aired on May 1, 2017, on AMC in the United States. Outside of the United States, the episode premiered on streaming service Netflix in several countries.

Plot

Opening 
In a flashback to 1999, Hector Salamanca introduces Ximenez Lecerda to Don Eladio. Hector says he has purchased an Albuquerque ice cream store that will facilitate drug sales because Ximenez can bring cocaine over the border when he delivers store supplies. Hector has named the store for Eladio: "El Griego Guiñador". He also presents the gift of a bobblehead mascot for the store which is named "Sabrosito”, as well as a cash tribute. Juan Bolsa arrives with Gus Fring's gifts — a Los Pollos Hermanos T-shirt and larger cash tribute. Eladio teases Hector and Hector is humiliated, but Juan reminds him to show respect to their boss.

Main story 
Mike Ehrmantraut surveils Hector's ice cream store and observes police arrive. He later visits Stacey Ehrmantraut and Kaylee Ehrmantraut at their new house. Hector, Nacho Varga, and Arturo visit Los Pollos Hermanos and intimidate the staff while waiting for Gus. When Gus arrives, Hector demands that Gus begin transporting Hector's drugs in Gus's trucks, unaware Gus desires this outcome.

The next day, Gus apologizes to his staff and tells them the men who intimidated them previously extorted money from him in Chile, but that he refused their new demands. He announces he will pay the staff overtime, in addition to trauma counseling if anyone requests it. Gus's apology and claim to be acting honorably win his staff over.

Kim Wexler cancels the appointment Chuck McGill made to have his home's door repaired and Jimmy McGill hires Mike to keep it. Mike clandestinely photographs the interior of Chuck's house and documents his bizarre living conditions. Mike also copies some information from Chuck's desktop. When he hands over the photos the next day, he gives Jimmy the note he made.

Gus visits Mike to ask why he did not accept the money that Victor tried to give him for disrupting Hector's trucks. Mike explains that he attacked them for himself, not Gus, so he does not expect payment. Gus says he is interested in hiring Mike, and Mike says he might be amenable.

Jimmy, Kim, Howard Hamlin, Chuck, and ADA Hay meet to finalize Jimmy's confession. Afterward, Kim tells Chuck she suspects he has another copy of the tape. Chuck confirms that he plans to submit the original at Jimmy's bar association hearing. Kim informs Jimmy and reveals that having Chuck admit the existence of the second tape is part of her plan to defend Jimmy.

Production 
The title is derived from the Spanish word "Sabroso" which means "delicious" or "tasty". In the cold open, Gus' homosexuality is hinted at when Hector says a better name for "Los Pollos Hermanos" ("The Chicken Brothers") might be "Los  Hermanos" ("The Butt Brothers").

Reception

Ratings 
Upon airing, the episode received 1.56 million American viewers, and an 18-49 rating of 0.6.

Critical reception 
The episode received critical acclaim, on Rotten Tomatoes, the episode holds a 100% rating with an average score of 8.64/10, based on 15 reviews. The site's consensus reads,  '"Sabrosito" juggles narrative strands while advancing Better Call Saul's overall narrative arc—and setting up moments Breaking Bad fans have waited patiently for.'

Terri Schwartz of IGN gave the episode an 8.5 rating, writing "Gus Fring is not a man you want to trifle with, as we discover in the latest episode of Better Call Saul."

Notes

References

External links 
 "Sabrosito" at AMC
 

Better Call Saul (season 3) episodes